Limonium sundingii is a species of flowers that belong to the family Plumbaginaceae. The species is endemic to Cape Verde. It is listed as critically endangered by the IUCN.

Distribution and ecology
Limonium sundingii is restricted to the island of São Nicolau, where it occurs in a small area in the east of the island, between 600 and 700 m elevation. They are found in humid and sub-humid zones.

References

sundingii
Flora of São Nicolau, Cape Verde
Endemic flora of Cape Verde